Associazione Sportiva Dilettantistica Football Club Matese, commonly referred to as F.C. Matese (also stylised as FC Matese), is a football club based in Sepicciano, a  of Piedimonte Matese, in Campania, Southern Italy. The club currently competes in Serie D, the fourth tier of the Italian football league system.

History

A History of Sport in Piedimonte Matese (Piedimonte d'Alife) 
Sport in the modern era in Piedimonte Matese (known until 1970 as Piedimonte d'Alife) traces its roots back to Pro Piedimonte, a multi-sports club founded in 1928. In addition to football, other sports such as; running and tug of war; were also practised. The club's first President (chairman) was Erminio Tedesco. Pro Piedimonte was in existence for at least 40 years.

Founding of A.S.D. Football Club Matese 
F.C. Matese was founded on the morning of 6 June 2020 from the merger of Eccellenza clubs A.S.D. Comprensorio Vairano (from Vairano Patenora) and A.S.D. Tre Pini Matese (from Piedimonte Matese). Despite being from Campania, both clubs played in the Molise divisions. The club's name, Football Club Matese, is often shortened to F.C. Matese; alternatively written as FC Matese. The new team was admitted to Serie D for the 2020–21 season, retaining the "Matese" part of its club name, with no mention of Comprensorio Vairano. Stadio Pasqualino Ferrante, formerly home to both Tre Pini Matese and fellow club F.W.P. Matese, was chosen as F.C. Matese's home venue.

Serie D

Inaugural campaign: 2020–21 season 
F.C. Matese's first-ever league fixture saw them face Olympia Agnonese away from home on 27 September 2020. The visitors got off to a flying start when Portuguese forward Leonardo Abreu scored to break the deadlock after six minutes. Corrado Urbano's side commanded a three-goal lead before the half-hour mark, scoring twice in the space of two minutes, with a goal from Italian forward Antonio Negro, before Leo Abreu volleyed home his second to make it 0–3 at half-time. Italian midfielder; Manél Minicucci netted F.C. Matese's fourth after 78 minutes to claim the club's first-ever win in Serie D. Following the club's comprehensive 0–4 away victory over Olympia Agnonese, F.C. Matese would lose their next two matches against Atletico Terme Fiuggi (2–3); and Montegiorgio Calcio (2–0), respectively. After a two-game losing streak, the club managed a 0–0 draw with Aprilia. Corrado Urbano's side then suffered a succession of defeats, losing 4–0 away to Città di Campobasso, 1–3 at home to Castelfidardo, 1–2 at home versus Castelnuovo Vomano, and 3–1 away to Cynthialbalonga. F.C. Matese returned to winning ways, with a first home victory and only their second of the season, coming in a 3–0 win over Vastese at Stadio Pasqualino Ferrante, thus bringing an end to their four-game losing streak. However, the team's winning run lasted just one match, as F.C. Matese fell to a 3–1 away defeat against Notaresco. After their first ten matches, F.C. Matese had recorded a mere two wins, one draw and six defeats, giving them just 7 points, leaving them sitting in the bottom half of the table. However, a change in fortunes; saw the club approach the midway point of the season in a steady position with 18 points, following three successive wins, two draws and one defeat taking their tally to five wins, three draws and eight losses for the season. F.C. Matese built upon their mid-season form, managing a 0–0 home draw against Rieti, a second win over Olympia Agnonese, and its first victory against Atletico Terme Fiuggi.

Promotion play-offs 
In its inaugural season (2020–21), under the management of Corrado Urbano, F.C. Matese recorded a fifth-place finish in the league, amassing 56 points after 34 games, leaving them tied on points with two other teams; third-placed Pineto and fourth-placed Cynthialbalonga. It meant that F.C. Matese had qualified for the Serie D promotion play-offs. However, as all three sides had finished on the same number of points, the play-off matches were decided on "Head-to-head", with Pineto scoring 6, Cynthialbalonga 5, and Matese 4. Consequently, F.C. Matese were drawn, against second-placed team Notaresco, with the match being played on 23 June 2021 at Notaresco's Stadio Comunale Vincenzo Savini. After trailing 1–0 at half-time, courtesy of a goal from Notaresco midfielder Mattia Frulla in the 21st-minute, the Matesini; were reduced to ten men, after defender Luigi Setola's sending off for a second yellow card with just under 20 minutes left to play of normal-time. F.C. Matese lost the semi-final 1–0, sending Notaresco; through to the play-off final against eventual winners Pineto.

2021–22 season 
It was announced that F.C. Matese would participate in the 2021–22 edition of the Coppa Italia Serie D.

Colours and crest 

F.C. Matese's colours are green & gold to symbolise both the Matese mountains and the agricultural fields. The club's circular badge features a gold band as its outermost layer, a second thinner white layer and a third, green layer resembling a ringed doughnut, which encases a white circle that depicts a wolf howling at a full moon, atop a summit and an elevated football. There is also two gold (sometimes white) stars and the Latin inscription "Duc in Altum", which translates to "Put Out Into The Deep", and MCMXXXV (the year 1935), in Roman numerals.

Sponsorship and kit manufacturers 
Their kit is; produced by Italian sportswear supplier Givova. Their shirt sponsor is Ponte Reale, an Italian company that manufactures Buffalo mozzarella cheese.

Players

Current squad

Out on loan

Former players 

  Léo Abreu
  Jonathan Adusa
  Francesco Apredda
  Lorenzo Ballerini
  Antonio Barbato
  Mario Barone
  Stefano Bruno
  Raffaele Buonocore
  Domenico Cantelmo
  Giancarlo Di Cillo
  Nicola Ciotola 
  Stefano Costantino 
  Piergiorgio Delicato
  Mario Esposito
  Roberto Felici
  Jardel
  Aleksander Kuzmanović
  Francesco Leonetti
  Pasquale Di Lullo
  Paolo Masotta
  Manél Minicucci 
  Damiano Modesto
  Christian Mulè 
  Antonio Negro 
  Badr El Ouazni
  Mattia Palombo 
  Francesco Palumbo
  Walter Ricci
  Paolo Riggio
  Liberato Russo 
  Gabriele Scacco
  Danilo Schettini 
  Luca Del Signore 
  Vincenzo Tommasone 
  Pompeo Tretola
  Nicola Vecchio
  Kristjan Vodopivec

Player records 
Most goals Luis Fabián Galesio – 26 : 2020–21, 2021–22

Most goals in one season Luis Fabián Galesio – : 15 : 2020–21

Management and staff 

Source:

Managers 
  Corrado Urbano (2020–2022)
  Fabrizio Perrotti (2022)
  Corrado Urbano (2022–)

Club records

Longest winning run
6 matches

Longest home winning streak
8 matches

Biggest wins
Home
3–0 against Vastese, 23 December 2020 (Serie D)
3–0 against Tolentino, 10 January 2021 (Serie D)
Away
4–0 against Olympia Agnonese, 27 September 2020 (Serie D)

Biggest losses
Home
3–1 against Castelfidardo, 1 November 2020 (Serie D)
Away
4–0 against Campobasso, 25 October 2020 (Serie D)
3–1 against Cynthialbalonga, 20 December 2020 (Serie D)
3–1 against Notaresco, 6 January 2021 (Serie D)

References

External links 
 Official YouTube Channel

Sport in Campania
Football clubs in Italy
Football clubs in Campania
Association football clubs established in 2020
Serie D clubs
2020 establishments in Italy
Piedimonte Matese